Nasser al-Dhaheri (born 1960) is an Emirati writer and journalist.

Early life and education

He was born in al-Ain, Abu Dhabi in the United Arab Emirates. He was educated in the UAE and in France. He has published several volumes of fiction and non-fiction, including short story collections and novels.

Career

As a journalist, he has been involved with a number of publications, such as al-Ittihad newspaper, Fairuz magazine, al-Idari magazine, and Faris magazine. He is the publisher and chief editor of Hudhud, an electronic newspaper which appears in Arabic, English, French and Spanish.

In 2009, al-Dhaheri was a participant in the inaugural IPAF Nadwa. His work has appeared in English translation in Banipal magazine.

References

1960 births
Emirati journalists
Emirati writers
Living people
People from Abu Dhabi